The 2012 Czech Republic motorcycle Grand Prix was the twelfth round of the 2012 Grand Prix motorcycle racing season. It took place on the weekend of 24–26 August 2012 at the Masaryk Circuit located in Brno.

Classification

MotoGP

Moto2

Moto3

Championship standings after the race (MotoGP)
Below are the standings for the top five riders and constructors after round twelve has concluded.

Riders' Championship standings

Constructors' Championship standings

 Note: Only the top five positions are included for both sets of standings.

References

Czech Republic motorcycle Grand Prix
Czech Republic
Motorcycle Grand Prix
Czech Republic motorcycle Grand Prix